Erastvere is a village in Kanepi Parish, Põlva County in southeastern Estonia. It is located just southeast of Kanepi, the centre of the municipality, and is passed by the Tallinn–Tartu–Võru–Luhamaa road (E263). As of 2011 Census, the village's population was 286.

The village centre is situated by the 16.3 ha Lake Erastvere, which is the origin of the Ahja River. The Võhandu River also passes Erastvere on its western side. Erastvere is the site of the former Erastvere (Errestfer) knight manor. The main building hasn't survived, a newer nursery home building is located on the site.

On , during the Great Northern War, the Battle of Erastfer took place about 3 km southeast of Erastvere in nowadays Magari village. The Russian troops with 18,800 men took the victory over the Swedish 2,470 men. It was the first significant Russian victory in the Great Northern War.

Gallery

References

External links
Erastvere Nursing Home 

Villages in Põlva County
Kreis Werro